Lee Da-bin (born 7 December 1996) is a South Korean taekwondo practitioner. She competes for South Korea mainly in middleweight category at international competitions.

Lee Da-bin represented South Korea at the Asian Games in 2014 and 2018. She clinched a gold medal in the women's 62kg event during the 2014 Asian Games. Four years later, she clinched another gold medal in the women's +67kg event defeating Kazakhstani Cansel Deniz during the 2018 Asian Games. She became a world champion in the women's middleweight event at the 2019 World Taekwondo Championships.

She represented South Korea at the 2020 Summer Olympics which also marked her debut appearance at the Olympics. She qualified to the women's 67 kg event final after a nail biting last minute win over Britain's Bianca Walkden. She lost the gold medal match to Serbia's Milica Mandic in the women's 67kg taekwondo event.

She won the silver medal in the women's middleweight event at the 2022 World Taekwondo Championships held in Guadalajara, Mexico.

References

External links

1996 births
Living people
South Korean female taekwondo practitioners
Taekwondo practitioners at the 2014 Asian Games
Taekwondo practitioners at the 2018 Asian Games
Medalists at the 2014 Asian Games
Medalists at the 2018 Asian Games
Asian Games gold medalists for South Korea
Asian Games medalists in taekwondo
Universiade medalists in taekwondo
Universiade gold medalists for South Korea
Universiade bronze medalists for South Korea
World Taekwondo Championships medalists
Asian Taekwondo Championships medalists
Korea National Sport University alumni
Medalists at the 2015 Summer Universiade
Medalists at the 2017 Summer Universiade
Taekwondo practitioners at the 2020 Summer Olympics
Olympic taekwondo practitioners of South Korea
Olympic silver medalists for South Korea
Olympic medalists in taekwondo
Medalists at the 2020 Summer Olympics
Sportspeople from Ulsan
21st-century South Korean women